Electoral reform in the United States refers to efforts to change American elections and the electoral system used in the United States.

Most elections in the U.S. select one person;  elections with multiple candidates selected by proportional representation are relatively rare.  Typical examples include the House of Representatives, whose members are elected by a plurality of votes in single-member districts.  The number of representatives from each state is set in proportion to each state's population in the most recent decennial census. District boundaries are usually redrawn after each such census.  This process often produces "gerrymandered" district boundaries designed to increase and secure the majority of the party in power, often by offering secure seats to members of the opposition party. This is one of a number of institutional features that increase the advantage of incumbents seeking reelection. The Senate and the president are also elected by plurality. However, these elections are not affected by gerrymandering (with the possible exception of presidential races in Maine and Nebraska, whose electoral votes are partially allocated by Congressional district).

Proposals for electoral reform have included overturning the Supreme Court's decision in Citizens United v. FEC, public and citizen funding of elections, limits and transparency in funding, ranked-choice voting (RCV), abolishing the Electoral College or nullifying its impact through the National Popular Vote Interstate Compact, and improving ballot access for third parties, among others. The U.S. Constitution gives states wide latitude to determine how elections are conducted, although some details, such as the ban on poll taxes, are mandated at the federal level.

Cost of the current system
The cost of getting elected, especially to any national office in the US, has been growing.  The Federal Elections Commission estimated that "candidates, parties, PACs, super-PACs, and politically active nonprofits" spent a total of $7 billion in 2012. The magazine Mother Jones said that this money was used "to influence races up and down the ballot", noting further that the cost of elections has continued to escalate. The 2010 congressional elections cost roughly $4 billion.

Spending averages just under $3 billion per year for the 4-year presidential election cycle.

This is small relative to what the major campaign contributors, crony capitalists (whether allegedly "liberal" or "conservative"), receive for their money. The Cato Institute found corporate welfare totaling $100 billion in the 2012 U.S. federal budget. This includes only direct subsidies specifically identified in the Cato Institute research. It does not include indirect subsidies like tax breaks, trade barriers, distorting copyright law beyond the "limited time" and other restrictions mentioned in the U.S. Constitution, and other distortions of U.S. foreign and defense policies to benefit major corporations and people with substantial financial interests outside the U.S.

Other studies have estimated between $6 and $220 return for each $1 invested by major corporations and ultra-wealthy individuals in lobbying and political campaigns.

This rate of return helps escalate the cost of elections. To obtain the money needed for their next election campaign, incumbent politicians spend a substantial portion of their time soliciting money from large donors, who often donate to competing candidates, thereby buying access with the one that wins.

This $3 billion per year is about $10 for each of the 316 million people in the US, $23 for each of the 130 million people who voted in 2012.

Electoral reform proposals
Josh Silver's "Cure for political corruption" divides electoral reforms between campaign finance, lobbying and election administration.

Most of the proposed reforms can be achieved at least in part by legislation, though some require amending the U.S. Constitution. The Supreme Court ruling in Citizens United v. FEC and related decisions would require a constitutional amendment to permanently change, and several have been proposed. Similarly, some proposed systems for campaign finance or restrictions on campaign contributions have been declared unconstitutional; implementation of those changes could require a constitutional amendment.

However, many other reforms can seemingly be achieved without a constitutional amendment. These include various forms of public financing of political campaigns, disclosure requirements and instant-runoff voting. The American Anti-Corruption Act (AACA) is one collection of reforms that appear to be consistent with existing US Supreme Court rulings, developed by Republican Trevor Potter, who had previously served as head of the US Federal Elections Commission under Democratic President Bill Clinton. Local versions of the AACA are being promoted by RepresentUs.

Campaign finance reform

Lawrence Lessig said, "On January 20, 2010, the day before Citizens United was decided, our democracy was already broken. Citizens United may have shot the body, but the body was already cold. And any response to Citizens United must also respond to that more fundamental corruption. We must find a way to restore a government 'dependent upon the People alone,' so that we give 'the People' a reason again to have confidence in their government."

Lessig favors systems that share as broadly as possible the decisions about which candidates or initiatives get the funding needed to get their message to the voters.  Following Bruce Ackerman, Lessig recommends giving each eligible voter a "democracy voucher" worth, e.g., $100 each election year that can only be spent on political candidates or issues. The amount would be fixed at roughly double the amount of private money spent in the previous election cycle.  Unlike the current Presidential election campaign fund checkoff, the decisions regarding who gets that money would be made by individual citizens.

Lessig also supports systems to provide tax rebates for such contributions or to match small dollar contributions such as the system in New York City that provides a 5-to-1 match for contributions up to $250. To be eligible for money from vouchers, rebates or matching funds, candidates must accept certain limits on the amounts of money raised from individual contributors.

Vouchers, tax rebates, and small dollar matching are called "citizen funding" as opposed to more traditional "public funding", which tasks a public agency with deciding how much money each candidate receives from the government.  While the Supreme Court of the United States has already struck down many forms of public funding of political campaigns, there are forms of public and especially citizen financing that seem consistent with the constitution as so far interpreted by the courts and could therefore be secured by standard legislative processes not requiring amending the constitution.

One bill that proposes such a system for U.S. congressional elections is "The Grassroots Democracy Act".  It was introduced September 14, 2012, by U.S. Representative John Sarbanes as H.R. 6426 and reintroduced on January 15, 2013 as H. R. 268.

Overturning Citizens United
The Citizens United v. FEC decision, January 21, 2010, of the U.S. Supreme Court has received substantial notoriety, pushing many people to work for a constitutional amendment to overturn it. Key provisions of that decision assert in essence that money is speech and subject to first amendment protections. Move to Amend began organizing to oppose that decision in September 2009. By June 2013, they had at least 164 local affiliates in 36 states plus the District of Columbia.  They had obtained roughly 300,000 individual signatures for their Motion to Amend and had secured the passage of 367 local resolutions and ordinances. United for the People is consortium of some 144 organizations supporting a constitutional amendment to overturn Citizens United.  The web site of United for the People lists 17 constitutional amendments introduced in the 112th United States Congress and 12 introduced by March 13, 2013, in the 113th proposing to overturn Citizens United in different ways.

The libertarian think-tank the Cato Institute is concerned that most proposed responses to Citizens United will give "Congress unchecked new power over spending on political speech, power that will be certainly abused."

Clean elections, clean money, and disclosure
Terms like "clean elections" and "clean money" are sometimes used inconsistently. Clean elections typically refers to systems where candidates receive a fixed sum of money from the government to run their campaigns after qualifying by collecting small dollar contributions (e.g., $5) from a large enough group of citizens.  Systems of this nature have been tried in Maine, Arizona, North Carolina, New Mexico, Vermont, Wisconsin, Massachusetts, Connecticut and elsewhere;  some of these have been disqualified at least in part by the courts.

"Clean money" is sometimes used as a synonym for clean elections; at other times, it refers to a DISCLOSE Act, requiring disclosure of the sources of campaign funds.  The DISCLOSE Act bill in the U.S. Congress seeks "to prohibit foreign influence in Federal elections, to prohibit government contractors from making expenditures with respect to such elections, and to establish additional disclosure requirements with respect to spending in such elections, and for other purposes."

The California Clean Money Campaign is pushing the California DISCLOSE act, which differs substantially from the federal DISCLOSE Act. The California bill would strengthen disclosure requirements for political advertisements. Among other provisions, it requires the top three contributors for any political ad to be identified by name on the ad.

Ackerman and Ayres propose a "secret donation booth", the exact opposite of full disclosure.  This system would require that all campaign contributions be anonymously given through a government agency.  Their system would give donors a few days to change their minds and withdraw or change the recipient of a donation;  it would also add a random time delay to ensure that the recipients of donations could never know for sure the source of the funds they receive.

Electing Supreme Court Justices
With an implementation of term limits and holding elections for Supreme Court Justices the United States could simply solve the contentious battle for when Supreme Court members unexpectedly die.  Packing the Supreme Court proposals would fade away if an election was going to decide the outcome. 33 States already elect their State Supreme Courts. William Watkins Jr. a Constitutional scholar from the Independent Institute on National Public Radio stated his proposal for 8 to 10 year one time term limits, he also said justices are supposed to be like umpires calling balls and strikes in the game but are acting more like coaches tinkering with starting lineups, and calling hit and runs. Local District attorneys and County Sheriffs are elected and so could Supreme Court Justices. The United States Senate use to be appointed by State legislatures before the 17th Amendment was passed in 1913 for them to be elected. A Second Constitutional Convention of the States to Amend the Constitution could be a way for this reform to proceed.

Proposed improvements or replacements to the current voting system

Approval voting

Approval voting is a non-rank-order but graded system in which voters may select all candidates that meet with the voter's approval.  The candidate with the highest approval score (i.e. approved by the most voters) wins the election. In elections with three or more candidates, voters may indicate approval of more than one candidate. Approval voting is the voting method which received the highest approval in a 2021 poll of electoral systems experts.

Approval voting is promoted by the Center for Election Science.

In 2017, the Colorado legislature considered approval voting. If the bill had passed, Colorado would have been the first state to approve approval voting legislation, but the bill was postponed indefinitely.

In 2018, Fargo, North Dakota, passed a local ballot initiative adopting approval voting for the city's local elections, and it was used to elect officials in June 2020, becoming the first United States city and jurisdiction to adopt approval voting.

In November 2020, St. Louis passed Proposition D to authorize a variant of approval voting (as unified primary) for municipal offices.

Ranked Choice Voting

Ranked voting, also called ranked choice voting in the United States, is a ballot design where voters can rank their choices. Popular methods used in some jurisdictions around the world include a system called instant-runoff voting (IRV) to elect one candidate, or a system called the single transferable vote (STV) to elect multiple candidates. Each voter ranks all (or at least some) of the available options. If one option is ranked first by a majority of voters, it wins. Otherwise, the option(s) obtaining the fewest votes is (are) eliminated, and the options ranked second by those voters get those votes.

IRV is being promoted in the U.S. by numerous individuals and organizations. One of these is FairVote, which provides a long list of endorsers of IRV, including President Obama, Senators John McCain and Bernie Sanders, five U.S. Representatives, policy analyst Michael E. Arth, the Green, Libertarian, and Socialist parties, a dozen state chapters of the League of Women Voters, four state chapters of the Democratic Party, the Republican Party of Alaska, and many others. It is currently being used in some jurisdictions in the U.S., including the state of Maine and, since November 2020, the state of Alaska.

The Institute for Political Innovation, along with organizations such as Unite America and Nevada Voters, supports "final five voting" which consists of a combination of general primaries to elect the top five candidates, with instant-runoff voting to decide the winner. A similar system was approved in Alaska via a 2020 ballot measure.

Fair Representation Act proposes to introduce STV, along with the multi-member districts, for elections to the House of Representatives.

Abolishing the Electoral College

There have long been concerns about problems with the Electoral College method of selecting the president and vice president. Under this system, the party that wins a plurality in a given state gets all that state's electoral votes. (In Maine and Nebraska, the plurality rule applies to each congressional district.)

Modern polling has allowed presidential campaigns to determine which states are "swing states" (also called "battleground states") and which will provide near-certain victories for either the Republican or Democratic candidates. The campaigns then increase their chances of winning by focusing primarily on the swing states. This effectively disenfranchises voters in other states to the extent that their concerns differ from those of voters in swing states.

Officially abolishing the Electoral College would require amending the U.S. Constitution. However, the same effect could be achieved if the Electoral College representatives from states with a majority of the electoral votes were all committed to vote for the presidential slate that achieves a national plurality (or the majority after instant-runoff voting):  Presidential candidates would then have to compete for votes in all 50 states, not just the typically less than a dozen swing states.

This is the idea behind the National Popular Vote Interstate Compact.  As of March 2022, sixteen states with electoral votes totaling 196 had approved the compact. To take effect it must be approved by states with electoral votes totaling 270, just over half of the 538 current total electoral votes.

Redistricting

In the United States House of Representatives and many other legislative bodies such as city councils, members are elected from districts, whose boundaries are changed periodically through a process known as redistricting. When this process is manipulated to benefit a particular political party or incumbent, the result is known as gerrymandering. The Open Our Democracy Act & the For the People Act are bills designed to end gerrymandering. The For the People Act passed the United States House of Representatives on March 3, 2020. As of June 2021, it has not been passed by the United States Senate. Due to the Uniform Congressional District Act, it is illegal for a state with more than one representative to elect its representatives proportionally in several multi-member districts or in an at-large election.

Compulsory voting
Voting is not required of citizens in any state, so elections are decided by those who show up.  Politicians target their message at getting their own supporters out to the polls, rather than winning over undecided voters or apathetic citizens. One solution to this problem is compulsory voting.

Compulsory voting has been criticized as "vaguely un-American" but potentially beneficial to democracy.

Compulsory voting has been proposed as a solution to make the pool of voters better represent the American population, particularly to make it more representative racially and socioeconomically.

Other proposals

Other proposals intended to make elections and political leaders more effective include:
 Move Election Day to a weekend to make it easier for workers to attend, or allow early voting on weekend days
 Provide voters better information on the consequences of ballot questions
 Higher salaries to reduce the influence of money in politics
 Longer terms in office to better match economic cycles, but with term limits
 Require candidates to have qualification in terms of education, profession, or life experience
 Weigh voters differently according to qualifications, such as passing a civics test or being in a profession that implies expertise on a topic related to a ballot question

Organizations supporting reforms
Notable organizations that support some variant of at least one of the reforms mentioned above include:

 Brennan Center for Justice
 Common Cause
 Equal Citizens
 FairVote
 League of Women Voters
 Move to Amend
 National Popular Vote Inc.
 Open Primaries
 People for the American Way
 Public Citizen
 RepresentWomen
 RepresentUs
 Rootstrikers

See also
Term limits in the United States
Electoral reform 
Voting rights in the United States

References

Notes

External links
"United for the People" lists of federal amendments of the 112th and 113th conghresses
Move to Amend list of other amendments 
Common Cause summary of public financing of political campaigns in 14 states

Fair Vote's web site
Arth campaign website with electoral reform issues
Declaration of Election-Method Reform Advocates
National Popular Vote Interstate Compact's web site

 
Ethically disputed political practices
Legislative districts of the United States
Political terminology of the United States
Voter suppression